The Mama's Gun World Tour was a concert tour and the second by American R&B singer Erykah Badu in support of her multi-platinum selling album Mama's Gun. The tour started in North America on February 10, in Cleveland, Ohio at the Allen Theatre. Badu will perform two nights each in Washington, D.C., Los Angeles, and Chicago.

The tour's itinerary will continue with additional dates throughout the summer in Europe and North America. When the tour arrived in Toronto, Canada on February 19, after Badu performed the finale song "Bag Lady", she received a Platinum certification plaque for her top selling album, 'Mama's Gun'.

Opening acts
Talib Kweli (USA—Leg 1 & 2, select dates)
Common (USA—Leg 1 & 2, select dates)
Musiq (USA—Leg 1)
Nikka Costa (USA—Leg 2)

Setlist

This represents an average setlist of the tour. 
 "Rimshot (Intro)" 
 "Otherside of the Game"
 "Time's A Wastin'"
 "Penitentiary Philosophy"
 "Didn't Cha Know?"
 "My Life"
 Medley: "On & On"/"...& On"
 "Cleva"
 "Hey Sugah" / "Kiss Me On My Neck (Hesi)"
 "A.D. 2000"
 *African Dance Segment*
 "Orange Moon"
 "Green Eyes"
 "Tyrone"
 "Bag Lady"

Additional Notes

During shows on February 23, in Chicago and March 7, in San Diego, Common joined Badu on stage and both performed "Geto Heaven Pt two" from his Platinum album, Like Water for Chocolate (2000).

Band
Director/Keyboards: Geno "JuneBugg" Young
Keyboards: R.C. Williams
Drums: Raphael "Lock Johnson" Iglehart
Percussions: Ramon Gonzalez
Flute: Dwayne Kerr
DJ: Frankie Knuckles
Bass: Braylon Lacy
Background vocals: N'dambi, Chinah Blac, Yahzarah

Tour dates

References

Erykah Badu concert tours
2001 concert tours